The W. C. Farley Building, is a historic commercial building in Carmel-by-the-Sea, California. It was built and designed in 1927, by master builder Michael J. Murphy as a retail shop. It is an example of a Mediterranean Revival architecture style building. The structure is recognized as an important commercial building in the city's Downtown Conservation District Historic Property Survey, and was nominated and submitted to the California Register of Historical Resources on June 19, 2002. The building is now occupied by All About the Chocolate and Zimmerman Gallery.

History

The W. C. Farley Building was established for businessman W. C. Farley in 1927, located on Dolores Street between Ocean Avenue and 7th Avenue in Carmel-by-the-Sea, California, opposite the Mary Dummage Shop and the grouping of shops along Dolores Street that include the El Paseo Building, Tuck Box, De Yoe Building, Percy Parkes Building, and the Isabel Leidig Building. This group of buildings is one of the most architecturally significant business blocks in Carmel.

The W. C. Farley Building is a one-story Mediterranean Revival architecture-style building commercial building constructed of reinforced concrete with a low-pitched Spanish-style ceramic clay tile roof with a Carmel stone wall. The three wedge shaped shop stone entrances have low arched show windows with Dutch doors. Awnings were installed that cover one of the arched window and the entrance doors.

The center shop has a horizontal wood beam or lintel above the main entrance door that reads: "TA SUNKA WETKA," meaning "Chief Crazy Horse." It comes from the fact that Farley operated a general store and post office on the Rosebud Indian Reservation in South Dakota, and when he left the Indians gave him this honorary title.

The building qualified for inclusion in the city's Downtown Conservation District Historic Property Survey, and has been nominated and submitted to the California Register of Historical Resources on June 19, 2002. The property is significant under the California Register criterion 3, in the area of commercial Mediterranean Revival architecture development in downtown Carmel and as work done by master builder Michael J. Murphy.

The Dolores Street property has been the home of many businesses over the years. It was the site of the W. C. Farley's Mission Cleaners business for more than 60 years.

Several additions and remodeling’s took place over the years. In 1927, a dry-cleaning plant was constructed to the rear of the building by Murphy for $700. The cleaning plant was remodeled in 1969 for $10,000. In 1983, new store windows, Dutch doors, and awning were completed by contractor Alan Williams for $1,200. In 2000, an interior remodel was done for $1,800.

W. C. Farley
William Clarence Farley (1885-1966) was born on November 13, 1885, in Indiana. His father was Forrest Silvers Farley (1854-1934) and his mother was Eva Louise Eaton (1857-1939). He married Nellie L. Copeland (1885-1968) on June 12, 1908, in Butte, Nebraska. They had one child during their marriage, Henrietta F. Farley (1909-1997).

In the early 1920s, Farley first entered the dry cleaning business when he purchased a plant at Paso Robles, California. In 1924, Farley founded the first dry-cleaning business in Carmel-by-the-Sea.

Farley was called to Washington, D.C. in the 1930s by the National Association of Cleaners and Dyers, where he served as technical field engineer for several years. In 1934, he then became the technical engineer in the dry cleaning industry at the Marshall Steel plant in Oakland, California, and directed the activities of a new $250,000 plant.

He later moved to Brownsville, Texas with his daughter, Henrietta and her husband Frederick de Stefano (1900-1974).

On June 22, 1958, William and Nellie Farley celebrated their fiftieth golden wedding anniversary at Elm Grove Lodge at North Terre Haute, Indiana. He was there visiting his sister, Nellie E. Farley (1895-1997) and brother, James Lee Farley (1880-1958). Another brother, Harry E. Farley (1892-1973) was in Carmel-by-the-Sea.

Farley died on December 1, 1966, in Brownsville, Texas, at the age of 81. He was buried at the Buena Vista Burial Park in Brownsville.

See also
 List of Historic Buildings in Carmel-by-the-Sea

References

External links

 Downtown Conservation District Historic Property Survey

1927 establishments in California
Carmel-by-the-Sea, California
Buildings and structures in Monterey County, California